Lucas Kawan Lopes dos Santos (born 14 February 2003) is a Brazilian professional footballer who plays as a right-back for Grêmio.

Career statistics

Club

References

2003 births
Living people
People from Imperatriz
Sportspeople from Maranhão
Brazilian footballers
Brazil youth international footballers
Association football defenders
Grêmio Foot-Ball Porto Alegrense players